Halcnovian , alternatively spelled Haltsnovian, is an East Central German dialect spoken in the former village of Hałcnów, which is now a district of Bielsko-Biała, Poland. It was the vernacular language of Hałcnów until 1945, when ethnic Germans were expelled from Poland. Some examples of the language were recorded in the works of Karl Olma (1914–2001), who was active as a journalist in the Halcnovian exile community in West Germany after World War II. Recently the dialect has been researched from a linguistic standpoint by Marek Dolatowski. It is related to the Wymysorys language.

Sample text

See also 
 Wymysorys language

Sources 

High German languages
German dialects
Languages of Poland